The Hellenic Paralympic Committee is the National Paralympic Committee in Greece for the Paralympic Games movement. It is a non-profit organisation that selects teams, and raises funds to send Greek competitors to Paralympic events organised by the International Paralympic Committee (IPC).

See also
Greece at the Paralympics

References

External links
Official website

National Paralympic Committees
Paralympic
Greece at the Paralympics
Sports organizations established in 2001
2001 establishments in Greece
Organizations based in Athens